The 1972 Senior League World Series was a baseball tournament for children aged 13 to 16 years old. It took place from August 15–20 in Gary, Indiana, United States. Pingtung, Taiwan defeated Oxnard, California in the championship game.

This year featured the debut of the Far East Region.

Teams

Results

Opening Round

Winner's Bracket

Loser's Bracket

Elimination Round

References

Senior League World Series
Senior League World Series
Baseball competitions in Indiana
Sports in Gary, Indiana
1972 in sports in Indiana